Outlaw is a single-player arcade game by Atari Inc., originally released in 1976. It simulates an Old West fast draw duel between the player and the computer. Outlaw was a response to Gun Fight, released by Midway in North America the year before.

Atari released ports of the game for the Atari 2600 console (then known as the Atari VCS) in 1978 and for the Atari 8-bit computers in 1981.

Technology
The game is housed in a custom cabinet that includes a light gun. The game PCB is composed of discrete technology, with game sprites stored in ROM.  Playfield graphics are provided by a screen overlay representing an Old West town street.

Gameplay
Players select one of two characters: Half-fast Pete or Billy-The-Kid. Pete is more accurate while Billy can draw faster. An outlaw appears somewhere in the town, the object being to fast draw your gun as soon as he draws his.  Shooting him before he shoots you scores points, with points counting toward end-of-game ratings such as "Dude", "Greenhorn", and "Top Gun".

Ports

An enhanced home video game console port was developed for the Atari VCS by then-Atari employee David Crane and released in 1978. This version is more directly comparable to Midway's Gun Fight, allowing two players to engage in a shoot-out using Atari CX40 joysticks. There are multiple modes that differ slightly from the arcade game, including target practice and versions with obstacles that must be shot around or shot through. There is also a multiplayer mode in which two players fight against each other.

Crane also developed Outlaw/Howitzer for the Atari 8-bit computers in 1979. It is a two-in-one game, in which the player can choose to duel either as cowboys or tanks, the former game mode being similar in gameplay to the VCS version. Outlaw/Howitzer was made available for purchase through Atari Program Exchange in summer of 1981.

Reception
Eric Thompson reviewed the Atari 2600 port of Outlaw in The Space Gamer No. 34. Thompson commented that "This game is fun, and if you have the [Atari 2600] computer you should get it."

Reviews
Creative Computing (Jul, 1978)

References

1976 video games
Arcade video games
Atari arcade games
Atari 2600 games
Atari 8-bit family games
Namco arcade games
Shooter video games
Western (genre) video games
Discrete video arcade games
Video games developed in the United States